Galomecalpa is a genus of moths belonging to the family Tortricidae.

Species
Galomecalpa concolor Razowski & Pelz, 2006
Galomecalpa defricata (Meyrick, 1926)
Galomecalpa empirica Razowski & Becker, 2003
Galomecalpa hydrochoa (Meyrick, 1930)
Galomecalpa lesta Razowski & Pelz, 2013
Galomecalpa majestica Razowski & Wojtusiak, 2013
Galomecalpa megaloplaca (Meyrick, 1932)
Galomecalpa meridana Razowski & Brown, 2004
Galomecalpa minutuncus Razowski & Wojtusiak, 2008
Galomecalpa monogramma (Razowski, 1997)
Galomecalpa parsoni Razowski & Pelz, 2006
Galomecalpa quatrofascia Razowski & Wojtusiak, 2009
Galomecalpa secunda Razowski & Becker, 2002
Galomecalpa suffusca Razowski & Pelz, 2006
Galomecalpa tamaria Razowski & Wojtusiak, 2013
Galomecalpa tingomaria Razowski & Wojtusiak, 2010

Habitat
The habitat consists of cloud forests at altitudes ranging from 1,200 to 2,800 meters.

Distribution
The genus is found in Venezuela, Peru, Colombia, Ecuador and Bolivia.

See also
List of Tortricidae genera

References

 , 2005, World Catalogue of Insects 5
 , 2006: Gauruncus Razowski, 1988 and Galomecalpa Razowski, 1990 from Ecuador (Lepidoptera: Tortricidae: Euliini). Shilap Revista de Lepidopterologia 34 (135): 289–303. Full article: .
 , 2009: Tortricidae (Lepidoptera) from the mountains of Ecuador and remarks on their geographical distribution. Part IV. Eastern Cordillera. Acta Zoologica Cracoviensia 51B (1-2): 119–187. doi:10.3409/azc.52b_1-2.119-187. Full article:  .
 , 2010: Tortricidae (Lepidoptera) from Peru. Acta Zoologica Cracoviensia 53B (1-2): 73-159. . Full article:  .

External links
tortricidae.com

Euliini
Tortricidae genera